CCS may refer to:

Business and brands
CC's, a corn chip brand
CCS.com, a skateboard/snowboard brand and retailer
Cross currency swap
Circuit City Stores, an American electronics retail company
Central Coast Section, of the California Interscholastic Federation

Computer science
 Calculus of communicating systems, a modeling approach
 Coded character set, in which each character corresponds to a unique number
 Code Composer Studio, an integrated development environment for Texas Instruments processors
 Common-channel signaling, a method of transmitting control information
 complete corresponding source, a requirement for GNU General Public Licenses
 ACM Computing Classification System, for publications
 CeVIO Creative Studio, a speech and singing synthesis software

Entertainment

Cardcaptor Sakura, a manga and anime series
CCS (band), also known as C.C.S., a British music group

Education
 Common Core State Standards Initiative, a United States educational standards effort
 Carroll County Schools, in Mississippi's Carroll County School District
 Coast Christian Schools, now known as Valor Christian Academy
College of Creative Studies, Santa Barbara, California
College for Creative Studies, Detroit, Michigan
Caroline Chisholm School, England
Cowbridge Comprehensive School, Wales
Calvary Christian School (Covington, Kentucky)
Cornway College a private, co-educational, day and boarding school in Zimbabwe
Coventry Christian Schools
Community Christian School (disambiguation)
Casino Christian School, New South Wales
Center for Cartoon Studies, an art institute

Energy
Carbon capture and storage, a technology used to reduce or eliminate  emissions from thermal power plants
Copper-clad steel, a type of bimetallic conductor
Combined Charging System, a plug standard for fast charging electric vehicles

Gaming
Cases Computer Simulations, a video strategy and war game company
Candy Crush Saga, a puzzle video game

Organisations
Cabinet Committee on Security, in the Cabinet of India
Canadian Cardiovascular Society
Casualty Clearing Station, a medical facility operated by British Empire forces during World War I
Ceylon Civil Service
Centre for Civil Society
China Communications Services
China Classification Society
Combined Chiefs of Staff, the supreme military command for the western Allies during World War II
Comparative Cognition Society, a scientific society for the study of animal cognition and comparative psychology
Computer Conservation Society
Consumers Cooperative Services, a network of New York City consumer cooperatives founded in the 1920s
Crippled Children Society, founded in New Zealand in 1935 by Alexander Gillies
Crown Commercial Service, an executive agency and trading fund of the Cabinet Office of the UK Government
Committee of Concerned Scientists, an organization supporting human rights of scientists around the world

Places
 Abbreviation for Caracas, Venezuela
 IATA code for Simón Bolívar International Airport in Caracas, Venezuela

Science
 Cartesian coordinate system, a mathematical system
 Capsanthin/capsorubin synthase, an enzyme
 Cellular Confinement Systems (geocells), a honeycombed geosythethetic matrix filled with granular material
 Chinese Chemical Society (Taipei), a scholarly organization
 Chinese Chemical Society (Beijing), a scholarly organization
 Critical community size, a parameter used in vaccination and eradication campaigns
 Chemical formula for the compound thioxoethenylidene
 CCS (gene), a copper chaperone for superoxide dismutase
 Chronic Covid Syndrome, long-term medical symptoms
 Collision cross-section, a parameter in Ion mobility spectrometry

Sports
Canadian Cue Sport Association
CC Sabathia (born 1980), American baseball player
Cardiff City Stadium, in Wales
CIF Central Coast Section, part of the California Interscholastic Federation
Championship Cup Series, a motorcycle road racing sanctioning body
Capital City Service, a football hooligan gang attached to Hibernian FC
 Collegiate Conference of the South, a US college sports conference

Other uses
Container closure system, the packaging components for a pharmaceutical dosage
Critical code studies
CYLD cutaneous syndrome, an inherited, familial disorder involving the development of multiple skin tumors